Kids Don't Tell is a 1985 American made-for-television drama film about child molestation starring Michael Ontkean and JoBeth Williams.  The docudrama, which was directed by Oscar-nominated film editor Sam O'Steen (Chinatown, Postcards from the Edge), was broadcast on CBS on March 5, 1985.

Plot
Driven by a duty to his young daughter (Ari Meyers), filmmaker John Ryan (Michael Ontkean) agrees to produce a documentary on the sexual abuse of children in the American status quo.  However, his loving wife Claudia (JoBeth Williams) becomes increasingly despondent and troubled as the filmmaker immerses himself further into the project.  Ryan obtains participation from a host of experts in the field, including a Los Angeles police detective (Leo Rossi), who provides powerful insight into how the legal system fails, and a habitual molester (Jordan Charney), who tells of his technique for choosing and assaulting his victims.

Cast

Michael Ontkean as John Ryan 
JoBeth Williams as Claudia Ryan 
Leo Rossi as Detective Rastelli 
Ari Meyers as Nicky Ryan 
John Sanderford as Eli Davis 
Jordan Charney as Tatum 
Leaf Phoenix as Frankie
Robin Gammell as Dr. Houghton 
Shelley Morrison as Carol 
Jean Bruce Scott as Clare 
Matthew Faison as Evan Harris 
David S. Aaron as Waiter 
Roger Askin as Man at Wedding 
Judith Barsi as Jennifer Ryan 
Gary Bayer as Speaker at Meeting 
Earl Billings as Terry 
Dennis Bowen as Ted 
Sally Brown as Jill 
Victor Campos as Dale 
Diane Cary as Sandra Luce (as Diane Civita) 
E.M. Fredric as Cocktail Waitress 
Kristin Gamboa as Linda 
Mari Gorman as Macy 
Nancy Lee Grahn as Puppet Lady 
Natalie Gregory as Krista Mueller
David Kaufman as Kenny 
Charles Lanyer as Scotty 
Michael Laskin as Man at Park 
Christopher Lofton as Charles 
Oceana Marr as Mildred 
Bob Minor as Pool Player 
Milton Murrill as Detective Timmy 
John Napierala as David 
David Lloyd Nelson as Lyle 
Greg Nourse as Bartender 
Steve Pershing as Officer at Desk (as Stephen Pershing) 
Branscombe Richmond as Pool Player 
Jack Thibeau as Donny 
Cori Wellins as Lisa 
Jaleel White as Christofer 
Barbra Rae as Daphne

References

External links

1985 television films
1985 films
1985 drama films
CBS network films
American docudrama films
Films scored by Fred Karlin
Films set in Los Angeles
Films shot in Los Angeles
Films directed by Sam O'Steen
American drama television films
1980s English-language films
1980s American films